This list of botanical gardens and arboretums in South Carolina is intended to include all significant botanical gardens and arboretums in the U.S. state of South Carolina.

See also
List of botanical gardens and arboretums in the United States

References

 
 
Tourist attractions in South Carolina
botanical gardens and arboretums in South Carolina